Gussing (district)

The Bezirk Güssing is an administrative district (Bezirk) in the federal state of Burgenland, Austria, bordering on Vas County of Hungary, of which it had been a part prior to 1921.

The area of the district is 486.71km², with a population of 25,668 (2022), and the population density is 53 persons per km². The administrative center and the largest settlement in the district is Güssing. Other main settlements include Stegersbach, Kukmirn and Olbendorf.

Administrative divisions 
The district consists of the below municipalities and towns:

References